Murphyville was a short lived placer gold mining camp 12 miles below El Dorado Canyon, on the east bank of the Colorado River in Arizona Territory, in 1891.

The site today is now lost under Lake Mohave.

References

Ghost towns in Arizona
Former populated places in Mohave County, Arizona
1891 establishments in Arizona Territory
Populated places established in 1891